Harris is an unincorporated community in Anderson County, Kansas, United States.  As of the 2020 census, the population of the community and nearby areas was 47.

History
Harris was founded in 1886. It was a station on the Missouri Pacific Railroad.

The post office in Harris was discontinued in 1971.

Geography
Harris is located at  (38.319420, -95.437394).

Demographics

For statistical purposes, the United States Census Bureau has defined Harris as a census-designated place (CDP).

2010 census
As of the census of 2010, there were 51 people, 21 households, and 13 families residing in the CDP. The racial makeup of the CDP was 100.0% White. Hispanic or Latino of any race were 5.9% of the population.

There were 21 households, of which 38.1% had children under the age of 18 living with them, 47.6% were married couples living together, 14.3% had a female householder with no husband present, and 38.1% were non-families. 33.3% of all households were made up of individuals, and 9.5% had someone living alone who was 65 years of age or older. The average household size was 2.43 and the average family size was 3.15.

The median age in the CDP was 38.8 years. 29.4% of residents were under the age of 18; 5.9% were between the ages of 18 and 24; 23.5% were from 25 to 44; 25.5% were from 45 to 64; and 15.7% were 65 years of age or older. The gender makeup of the CDP was 51.0% male and 49.0% female.

2000 census
As of the census of 2000, there were 53 people, 21 households, and 14 families residing in the city. The racial makeup of the city was 100.00% White.

There were 21 households, out of which 33.3% had children under the age of 18 living with them, 66.7% were married couples living together, 4.8% had a female householder with no husband present, and 28.6% were non-families. 28.6% of all households were made up of individuals, and 14.3% had someone living alone who was 65 years of age or older. The average household size was 2.52 and the average family size was 3.07.

In the city the population was spread out, with 28.3% under the age of 18, 1.9% from 18 to 24, 30.2% from 25 to 44, 22.6% from 45 to 64, and 17.0% who were 65 years of age or older. The median age was 38 years. For every 100 females, there were 103.8 males. For every 100 females age 18 and over, there were 81.0 males.

The median income for a household in the city was $34,375, and the median income for a family was $33,125. Males had a median income of $30,625 versus $17,917 for females. The per capita income for the city was $13,259. There were 23.1% of families and 15.2% of the population living below the poverty line, including no under eighteens and 10.5% of those over 64.

See also
 National Register of Historic Places listings in Anderson County, Kansas

References

Further reading

External links
 USD 365, local school district
 Anderson County maps: Current, Historic, KDOT

Census-designated places in Anderson County, Kansas
Census-designated places in Kansas
Populated places disestablished in 2001